Khesht Masjed or Khesht-e Masjed may refer to:
 Khesht Masjed, Rasht
 Khesht Masjed, Kuchesfahan, Rasht County